João Artur Rosa Alves (born 18 August 1980) is a Portuguese retired professional footballer who played as a central midfielder.

Club career
Born in Chaves, Alves started his professional career at hometown club G.D. Chaves, making his debut in the Primeira Liga on 11 November 1998 in a 1–2 home loss against U.D. Leiria after coming in as a substitute in the 63rd minute. He appeared in a further nine league matches during that season, with the northerners eventually being relegated after ranking 17th.

In 2004–05, after five additional campaigns with Chaves in the second division, Alves joined S.C. Braga, his first league appearance occurring on 14 November 2004 in a 0–0 draw at Leiria. After some solid performances that helped the Minho side finish fourth, he moved to Sporting CP.

After having appeared just twice for Sporting in 2006–07, Alves signed a three-year contract with Vitória S.C. in July 2007, with Sporting keeping half of the player's rights. In his first year, he only missed one league game as his team came straight from the second level into a final third place.

Alves made an average of 23 league appearances in the following three seasons, and on 20 June 2011 he replaced veteran Flávio Meireles as club captain.

International career
On 17 August 2005, Alves made his debut for the Portugal national team, making an assist for Hélder Postiga in a 2–0 friendly win over Egypt.

Career statistics

Club

Honours

Club
Sporting
Taça de Portugal: 2006–07

Omonia
Cypriot Super Cup: 2012

International
Portugal
UEFA European Under-19 Championship: 1999

References

External links

1980 births
Living people
People from Chaves, Portugal
Portuguese footballers
Association football midfielders
Primeira Liga players
Liga Portugal 2 players
G.D. Chaves players
S.C. Braga players
Sporting CP footballers
Vitória S.C. players
Académico de Viseu F.C. players
S.C. Freamunde players
Cypriot First Division players
AC Omonia players
Portugal youth international footballers
Portugal international footballers
Portuguese expatriate footballers
Expatriate footballers in Cyprus
Portuguese expatriate sportspeople in Cyprus
Sportspeople from Vila Real District